Francisca Laia (born 31 May 1994) is a Portuguese sprint canoeist. She competed in the women's K-1 200 metres event at the 2016 Summer Olympics.

References

External links
 

1994 births
Living people
Portuguese female canoeists
Olympic canoeists of Portugal
Canoeists at the 2016 Summer Olympics
People from Abrantes
European Games competitors for Portugal
Canoeists at the 2015 European Games
Canoeists at the 2019 European Games
ICF Canoe Sprint World Championships medalists in kayak
Sportspeople from Santarém District